Worcester Reed Warner (May 16, 1846 – June 25, 1929) was an American mechanical engineer, entrepreneur, manager, astronomer, and philanthropist. With Ambrose Swasey he cofounded the Warner & Swasey Company.

Biography

Life and career
Warner was born near Cummington, Massachusetts. He met Swasey at the Exeter Machine Works. On the completion of their apprenticeship in 1870, both entered the employ of Pratt & Whitney in Hartford, Connecticut.

In 1880 he co-founded a business to manufacture machines with Ambrose Swasey. The firm, Warner & Swasey, was initially located in Chicago but soon moved to Cleveland. Worcester Warner would design the 36-inch refracting telescope installed at Lick Observatory in 1888. He later built telescopes that were used in Canada and Argentina.

Further activities 
Warner was a charter member of the American Society of Mechanical Engineers, and from 1897 to 1898 he served as the 16th president of ASME. (Ambrose Swasey would later serve as the 23rd ASME president.) In 1900 the firm was incorporated as Warner & Swasey Company. Warner served as president and chairman of the board, but retired in 1911.

Both Warner and Ambrose Swasey also became trustees of the Case School of Applied Science. As both men had an interest in astronomy, they donated an entire observatory to the school. This became the Warner and Swasey Observatory. It was dedicated in 1920.

The Warner Building on Case Western Reserve University houses the Worcester Reed Warner Laboratory, named after the former university trustee. The construction of this building was partly funded by Worcester Warner.

The crater Warner on the Moon is named after him.

Death 
Warner died in Eisenach, Saxe-Weimar, Germany and is buried in Sleepy Hollow Cemetery, Sleepy Hollow, New York.

Worcester Reed Warner Medal

The Worcester Reed Warner Medal is awarded by the ASME for "outstanding contribution to the permanent literature of engineering". It was established by bequest in 1930. Some of the recipients are: 

 1933: Dexter S. Kimball 
 1934: Ralph Flanders
 1935: Stephen Timoshenko
 1943: Igor Sikorsky
 1945: Joseph M. Juran
 1947: Arpad L. Nadai
 1949: Fred B. Seely
 1951: Jacob Pieter Den Hartog
 1954: Joseph Henry Keenan 
 1956: James Keith Louden
 1957: William Prager
 1960: Lloyd H. Donnell
 1965: Ascher H. Shapiro
 1967: Nicholas J. Hoff
 1969: Hans W. Liepmann
 1970: Wilhelm Flügge
 1971: Stephen H. Crandall
 1975: Philip G. Hodge, Jr.
 1979: Darle W. Dudley
 1980: Olgierd Zienkiewicz
 1984: Yuan-Cheng Fung
 1990: J. Tinsley Oden 
 1992: J. N. Reddy 
 1997: Zdenek P. Bazant
 1998: Thomas J. R. Hughes
 1999: Yogesh Jaluria 
 2007: Portonovo Ayyaswamy
 2016: Isaac Elishakoff
 2017: Michael Paidoussis
 2018: Martin Ostoja-Starzewski
 2019: Arun Srinivasa
 2020: Marco Amabili

References

Bibliography
 .
 .

1846 births
1929 deaths
People from Cummington, Massachusetts
American mechanical engineers
Machine tool builders
Presidents of the American Society of Mechanical Engineers
American astronomers
Case Western Reserve University people
Burials at Sleepy Hollow Cemetery